

Final standings
Note: GP = Games played, W = Wins, L = Losses, T = Ties, OTL = Overtime losses,  GF = Goals for, GA = Goals against, Pts = Points.

Playoffs
Calgary Oval X-Treme 3, Beatrice Aeros 0
The Calgary Oval X-treme won the Championship of the NWHL.

2003 Canadian championships
The Calgary Oval X-Treme  and the Brampton Thunder  competed in the 2003 Esso Women's National Hockey Championship. Calgary Oval X-treme won by a score of 6-3 in front of over 1,100 fans at Saskatchewan Place. Samantha Holmes scored twice while Colleen Sostorics and Delaney Collins each contributed two assists. Calgary Oval X-treme outscored their opponents in the tournament 46 to 10. With the win, Calgary Team was awarded the Abby Hoffman Cup.

Players of the game
Dana Antal, Calgary Oval X-Treme 
Jayna Hefford, Brampton Thunder

Scoring summary

Shots per period

Goaltending Stats

See also
 National Women's Hockey League (1999–2007) (NWHL)

References

National Women's Hockey League (1999–2007) seasons
NWHL